Framlingham is a town in Suffolk, England, United Kingdom.

Framlingham may also refer to:

People
 Framlingham Gawdy (1589–1654), an English politician
 Michael Lord, Baron Framlingham (born 1938)

Places
Framingham, Massachusetts, a town in the United States
Framlingham, Victoria, a town and former Aboriginal reserve in Australia

Associated with the English town
Framlingham branch, a former railway line from Wickham Market to Framlingham
Framlingham Castle, a castle
Framlingham College, a school
Framlingham Mere, a nature reserve and lake
Framlingham railway station, a former railway station
Framlingham Town F.C., a football club
RAF Framlingham, former Royal Air Force base near Framlingham